Marta Welander is a passionate advocate for human rights and has over 10 years of experience working for non-governmental organisations. She serves as the Executive Director for Refugee Rights Europe, where she and her team work to secure the human rights of refugees and displaced people in Europe.

Before founding Refugee Rights Europe in 2016, Marta worked for a variety of human rights-focused organisations. In addition to volunteering for various organisations, she is currently a trustee for Safe Passage International. Amnesty International has recognised Marta with two award nominations: the 2020 Brave Award and the 2018 Suffragette Award.

Marta is included as an Expert in the Brussels Binder, project aimed to bring more voices of women into European policy debates. She has written about asylum and migration, human rights, and humanitarian efforts for multiple online publications, and is a regular contributor to the Border Criminologies blog hosted by Oxford University. She is a visiting lecturer at the University of Westminster, where she is currently earning her doctorate degree. She holds a MA in Democratic Governance, a MA in International Relations, and a BA in International Relations and Arabic.

Marta is fluent in English and Swedish, and has working proficiency of French, and an intermediate level of Modern Standard Arabic. She has a demonstrated history of success in non-government organization management and fundraising, but is particularly skilled in research and human rights advocacy.

References 

Brussels Binder
Border Criminologies

External links
 Refugee Rights Europe, official website

Living people
Women human rights activists
British human rights activists
Year of birth missing (living people)